The Fire Service in South Korea (or Korea Fire Service) is an organization to prevent danger, to protect the Republic of Korea people's lives and property, fire suppression and rescue, relief of emergency patients, prevention of disaster, disaster response, and providing recovery after a disaster occurs. Fire fighters in South Korea are Fire officers, members of an obligatory fire-fighting unit, and Volunteer fire fighters. Regarding fire fighting activities, the Framework Act on Fire Service, rescue and emergency activities are regulated by Act of 119 Rescue and Emergency Medical Services. The national fire department is the responsibility of the Ministry of Public Safety and Security, and the local fire department is in charge of the city and circuit fire headquarters.

There are multiple criticisms such as the problem of the command system, the status of the firefighting organization, and the poor treatment of the firefighters, although a plurality of organizations are set up to carry out firefighting activities.

History

Before the Goryeo Dynasty 
According to Samguk Sagi, it is recorded that the fire occurred in King Munmu 2 years, 6 years, 8 years, and guess that the concept of arson was born.

From the Goryeo Dynasty, a system on the level of fire at the national level began to be prepared, preventing the fire with the name 'ban blame system', but no specialized organization existed. However, party officials and responsible officials in each government office are responsible for preventing fire, management has been dismissed unless fire prevents, civilians fire out deliberately or deliberately fire Put disciplinary discrimination by fireplace and place punishment, place administrators of gold coins in warehouse after 20 years of Wun Buddhist fire, and when the history checked occasionally and neglected their duties, punished.

Joseon Dynasty 

The fire fighting system of the Joseon Dynasty was established in 1426 (Sejong 8th year), the first firefighting organization specialized in the Korean Peninsula was set up under the salary, and began taking charge of the fire protection work. Initially, the forbidden army suppressed the fire, renamed the fire battalion as Ghum-Hwa(금화,禁火. fire fighter) in the dynasty era and working for 24 hours.

Korea under Japanese rule 
Fire department in the Japanese emperor's fortune occupation is responsible for the Department of Protection or Security Department of the Governor-General of Korea. In the 1910s, firefighters were placed at the police office in Seoul City and other major cities We organized firefighting groups and arranged firefighters. In 1922, the Gyeongseong firefighting group was rebuilt by the Gyeongseong fire house, and in 1925, the first fire station of the Gyeongseong fire station rewrote.

United States Army Military Government in Korea and Republic of Korea

National Fire Service 
In 1950 the National Fire Department of the Security Bureau was established, but in the same year it was reduced to being a directorate of the security department, and in 1955 the safety and protection department in charge of the fire department was in charge of the security department together with the guard department guard. The fire department was installed again in 1961 and was in charge of fire fighting work in the fire department of the Ministry of Internal Affairs and the Security Department of the Internal Affairs Department until 1971. In 1975 the civil defense fund law came into force and the Ministry became responsible for civil defense affairs, in which the NFD was partly responsible.

Since then, the National Emergency Management Agency was established in 2004 after the fire accident of the Daegu subway and the typhoon, but was dismantled by the Sinking of MV Sewol in 2014 and was transferred to the Ministry of Public Safety and Security. In 2017, on the basis of the Central Fire Service, the National Fire Agency was established as the country's singular firefighting service.

Local Fire Service 
In 1945, the fire department was established in the local government police department during the US military rule. In 1946, the Fire Fire Defense Committee and the municipal fire department were established, the Fire Department was established in 1947 and it was autonomous under the Ministry of Commerce, but in 1948 belonged to the state police administration regime. The fire department was established in Seoul Metropolitan City and Busan Metropolitan City in 1972, and in 1975, it was responsible for firefighting affairs in the fire department of the Civil affairs administration of each circuit. Since 1976 the mayor and county guard were in charge of firefighting work only in areas where fire stations were not established, but in 1992 the circuit Fire headquarters was established and reached the present.

Fire service structure 

The firefighting organization of the Republic of Korea consists of the National Fire Agency under the Ministry of Interior and Security and the city or circuit firefighting headquarters. Under the NFA's administrative supervision there are National 119 Rescue Headquarters and a National Fire Service Academy, and under the city or circuit Firefight Headquarters there are fire stations and local fire academies. The NFA is responsible to the central government, while the city or county fire headquarters is managed by the local government respectively.

Central Fire Service 
 National Fire Agency
 National 119 Rescue Headquarters

Local Fire Service

City Fire Service 
 Seoul Fire Services
 Busan Metropolitan City Fire Safety Headquarters
 Daegu Fire Department
 Incheon Fire Department
 Gwangju Fire Department
 Daejeon Fire Department
 Sejong Fire Department
 Ulsan Fire Department
 Changwon Fire Service Headquarters

Provincial Fire Service 
 Gyeonggi Disaster and Safety Headquarters
 Gyeonggi Northern Fire Headquarters
 Gangwon Fire Headquarters
 Chungbuk Fire Service Headquarter
 Chungnam Fire Service Headquarter
 Jeonbuk Fire Service
 Jeonnam Fire Service
 Gyeongbuk Fire Service Headquarters
 Gyeongsangnam-do Fire Department
 Jeju Fire Safety Headquarters

Lack of Fire Stations 
Although it is in principle to set up one fire station in one city, county, or ward, it was not protected, and as a result of the Fire headquarters in Gangwon Province analyzing fire life damage, there is a significant difference in death rate depending on the presence or absence of a fire station and insist on the necessity of establishing a fire station. However, a budget of about 7 billion won is consumed for establishing one fire station, and in municipalities with poor financial autonomy passively responding to the establishment of a fire station.

Fire officers 

The firefighters of the Republic of Korea are divided into 119 Fire Fighting Corps, 119 Rescue Squad, 119 Ambulance Corps by their work.

Rank 

It can be divided into 11 classes of national workers and 10 classes of regional workers.

Problem of disease 
South Korean firefighters work for about 84 hours a week, and there is little support for treatment of post-traumatic stress disorder. Indeed, the fire fighter with occupational illness is 14.3%. However, 88 percent of the firemen who wounded injured due to disadvantage did not declare that they were official illness. Diseases such as leukemia and blood cancer are not acknowledged to be official affairs in the state, and such a tone is maintained even after the Supreme Court's ruling.

Manpower shortage problem 
In order to solve the problem of excessive working hours, the local fire department changed the shift from two shifts to three shifts, but the total number of firefighters worked on the job wasn't added. In addition, the number of firefighters needed to be dispatched at the end of 2014 amounted to 50493, but only about 41 percent of the respondents are able to fill the vacancy.

See also 

 Ministry of Public Safety and Security

References 

Fire and rescue in South Korea
Emergency services in South Korea